is a Japanese singer. She graduated from Yugakkan High School in Kanazawa. She is best known for singing the opening and ending theme songs for the Hayao Miyazaki film My Neighbor Totoro: "Sanpo" and "My Neighbor Totoro". She is known for having a clear, light voice. 

Inoue is managed by the talent management firm Doremi. She is married and has one child.

Works
Inoue has performed a large number of radio dramas themes, anime theme songs, and anime insert songs, including the following:
 (1986, Laputa: Castle in the Sky)
 (1988, My Neighbor Totoro)
 (1988, My Neighbor Totoro)
 (1988, My Neighbor Totoro)
 (1989, Kiki's Delivery Service)
 (1989, Guyver: The Bioboosted Armor)
 (1992–1993, Yadamon)
 (1992–1993, Yadamon)
 (1992–1993, Yadamon)
 (February–March 1992, Minna no Uta)
 (Suki Suki Kisugon)
 (image song for TV Kanazawa)
 (August–September 2006, Minna no Uta)
 (2009, Hello, Anne: Before Green Gables)
 (2009, Hello, Anne: Before Green Gables)

Sources:

Discography

Singles
 / Message
2006-02-15, OWCR-1012, CD single, ¥1000, Rock Chipper Records, Japan
Lyrics by Ryūichi Sugimoto
Composed by Ryūichi Sugimoto
Believe is a cover.

2008-05-21, KDSD-00207, CD single, ¥1050, Team Entertainment, Japan

Sources:

Albums

2005-11-16, KDSD-00082, CD, ¥2100, Team Entertainment, Japan
This is an image album with songs from the drama CD release based on the Beyond the Beyond manga by Yoshitomo Watanabe.

2006-09-06, OWCR-2029, CD with DVD, ¥1500, Rock Chipper Records, Japan
Includes a bonus DVD with the Minna no Uta animation which goes with the title song.

Harmony
2008-07-23, KDSD-00225, CD, ¥1600, Team Entertainment, Japan

Sources:

Compilations
Inoue performed one or more songs on these albums. The songs performed are indicated below the album entry.

1988-06-25, 32ATC-167, CD, ¥2920, Tokuma Japan Communications, Japan
Inoue performs tracks 7–11.

1990-07-25, TKCA-30147, CD, ¥2427, Tokuma Japan Communications, Japan
Inoue performs tracks 2–3, 8, 10–11, and 13.

1990-09-25, TKCA-30147, CD, ¥2233, Tokuma Japan Communications, Japan
Inoue performs tracks 1, 3–5, 9, and 14.

1991-01-25, TKCA-30209, CD, ¥2427, Tokuma Japan Communications, Japan
Inoue performs tracks 8–10.

1991-12-21, TKCA-30488, CD, ¥1748, Tokuma Japan Communications, Japan
Inoue performs tracks 3, 5, 7, and 8.

1992-11-25, TKCA-30706, CD, ¥2233, Tokuma Japan Communications, Japan
Inoue performs tracks 4, 9, 11, 13, and 16.

1998-05-21, TKCA-71381, CD, ¥2913, Tokuma Japan Communications, Japan
Inoue performs tracks 2–4.

2005-04-20, KDSD-00067, CD, ¥2100, Team Entertainment, Japan
This is an album based on the Atelier series of video games from Gust. It contains theme songs from several of the games.
Vocal artists include Inoue, Miki Takahashi, Haruka Shimotsuki, Fukiko Ōta, Jun Kageie, and Taku Kitahara.

Sources:

Voice roles
Tengai Makyō II: Manjimaru (1992-03-26, Kinu)
Tengai Makyō: Fūun Kabukiden (1993-07-10, Kinu)
Tengai Makyō: Dennō Karakuri Kakutōden (1995-07-28, Kinu)
Tengai Makyō: Shinden (1995-07-28, Kinu)

References

External links
 DoReMi Forest (official site)

1965 births
Japanese women singers
Living people
People from Kanazawa, Ishikawa
Musicians from Ishikawa Prefecture
Anime musicians
Tokuma Japan Communications artists